Ruse of Fools is a rock band from Philadelphia, Pennsylvania. They have performed live with other artists including Tyler Hilton and Terra Naomi. Their album Art Is Dead was released December 11, 2012 on Bootstrap Recordings. The single "The Flood" was animated by Remy M. Larochelle and has been featured on MTV.

References

External links
 Official website

Indie rock musical groups from Pennsylvania
Musical groups from Philadelphia